General elections were held in the Cook Islands on 9 July 2014, determining the membership of the 14th Cook Islands Parliament.

The Cook Islands Party (CIP) initially appeared to have retained its majority, winning 13 seats, while the Democratic Party won eight and the new One Cook Islands Movement won two, with one seat tied. However, the result in one constituency the CIP had won was overturned in court, with the Democratic Party awarded the seat, while the tied seat was also awarded to the Democratic Party after one ballot was invalidated, resulting in a hung parliament.

Background
The previous elections were held on 17 November 2010. The term of the Parliament was due to expire four years after that date, on 17 November 2014. Elections had to be held no later than three months after that date, with 17 February 2015 being the latest date.

However, on 17 April 2014 the Queen's Representative, Tom Marsters, dissolved Parliament, setting an election date of 9 July. Marsters stated that the Prime Minister, Henry Puna, had informed him that the early election was required in order to have a new government in office prior to the 50th anniversary of the Cook Islands attaining self-government, which will occur in 2015. Masters also said that it would allow the new government to pass a budget in time for the anniversary. Puna blamed minister Teina Bishop for destabilising the government and necessitating the election. Bishop resigned as education and tourism minister the day after the election was announced and subsequently left the Cook Islands Party to form a new party. The Opposition claimed that the Prime Minister had called the election to avoid a no-confidence vote in Parliament, which Puna denied. Leader of the Opposition Wilkie Rasmussen criticised Puna for calling an election with bills yet to complete their passage in Parliament.

A list of candidates was publicly notified on 6 May. 52 candidates contested the election, a decrease from 70 in 2010. Six candidates were women, with Alexis Wolfgramm of the Pan Pacific and Southeast Asia Women's Association blaming the snap election for the lack of more female candidates.

10,394 people were enrolled to vote.

Electoral system
The 24 members of Parliament are elected in single-member constituencies using the first-past-the-post system.

Campaign
The Cook Islands Party campaigned on its record in government, including increasing pensions, other welfare payments and the minimum wage. It also highlighted income tax reductions, while the opposition Democratic Party criticised the government's value-added tax (VAT) increase and promised to reverse it. The Democratic Party also promoted a scheme for agricultural development on the outer islands, while the Cook Islands Party touted the infrastructure projects it had carried out in the outer islands. Bishop's new party, the One Cook Islands Movement, called for the taxation of pensions to be abolished and for subsidies to promote tourism in the outer islands. Both major parties, as well as independent candidates, used social media in an attempt to connect with younger voters. Former MP Iaveta Short criticised the campaign, saying parties were focused on "offering lollies to get votes" rather than providing solutions to the issues faced by the Cook Islands.

Results
There was a tie in Mitiaro, resulting in a by-election later in the year. However, before the by-election results were counted, a recount took place of the general election results after one voter's ballot was invalidated and the seat was awarded to Tangata Vavia of the Democratic Party, who won by a margin of 50–49.

By constituency
 Results

Analysis and reactions
The Cook Islands Party, despite winning fewer votes than the Democratic Party, retained its majority with 13 seats. The Democratic Party won eight seats and the newly formed One Cook Islands Movement two. One seat, Mitiaro, was tied, with a recount to be held there.

Preliminary results had given the Democratic Party 11 seats to the Cook Islands Party's 10, with two for the One Cook Islands Movement and one tied. They had also had Prime Minister Henry Puna trailing his Democratic Party opponent by two votes in Manihiki. However, the final results gave Puna a four-vote victory, while Democratic Party leader Wilkie Rasmussen, who had led by eight votes in the preliminary results, lost by 10 votes to the Cook Islands Party's Willie John in Penrhyn. Tokorua Pareina of the Cook Islands Party also defeated the Democratic Party's Tetangi Matapo by one vote in Tamarua, which had been tied in the preliminary results. Mitiaro, where the Democratic Party's Tangata Vavia had held a six-vote lead in the preliminary tallies, became in a tie in the final results.

One Cook Islands Movement leader Teina Bishop was re-elected in Arutanga-Reureu-Nikaupara, as was the party's other MP, George Angene, in Tupapa-Maraerenga.

In a major upset, Cook Islands Party candidate Rose Toki-Brown ousted veteran Democratic Party MP Norman George by 12 votes in Teenui-Mapumai. However, George claimed that his defeat was result of widespread bribery and said he would challenge it in court. Toki-Brown denied any wrongdoing. George stated that his party colleague Eugene Tatuava was also planning to challenge the result in Tengatangi-Areora-Ngatiarua, where he lost to Cook Islands Party MP Nandi Glassie by 15 votes.

Bishop questioned the validity of postal votes from New Zealand that arrived two days after election day, saying that this delay meant that they appeared to breach the Electoral Act. Chief Electoral Officer Taggy Tangimetua dismissed the issue as a "technicality", stating that she had received legal advice that she could count the votes and adding that the Electoral Act needed to be reformed to address impractical provisions.

Preliminary figures indicated that turnout had declined to 73.3%, but this increased to 79% in the final results. Democratic Party MP Selina Napa, who was re-elected in Titikaveka, claimed that the figures were skewed by outdated voter rolls that still listed people who had died or moved away. She was supported by Tangimetua, who noted that the rolls were supposed to be updated by the Ministry of Justice.

The Democratic Party questioned the accuracy of the count, with its president, Sean Willis, saying:

There are a lot of question marks hanging around about why a lot of Democratic votes by declaration were disallowed which were crucial in some outer island seats. There were postal votes that were accepted after the polling date. Basically we've lost the battle but we haven't lost the war. There are definitely going to be petitions.

The final results included an extra 1236 votes compared to the preliminary results. Earlier comments by Tangimetua had indicated that, in addition to the votes included in the preliminary count, the final count would include about 400 advance votes, between 100 and 300 postal votes, and 100 votes by declaration. The appearance of several hundred votes additional to those mentioned by the Chief Electoral Officer in the final count led to public concern and questions about where they had come from. An anonymous party official also alleged that a scrutineer had reported seeing ballot boxes being opened before the count started.

Aftermath
In September the High Court upheld an electoral petition submitted by the Democratic Party regarding the result in Tamarua, where Cook Islands Party candidate Tokorua Pareina had won by a single result. As a result of the court ruling, Democratic Party candidate Tetangi Matapo was declared the winner by three votes. This resulted in the Cook Islands Party losing its one-seat majority.

On 17 December 2014, the Court of Appeal voided the election of Cook Islands Party candidate (and Education Minister) Mona Ioane in Vaipae-Tautu, and ordered a by-election for 17 February. This ruling reduced the Puna government to the status of a minority government.

References

Cook
2014 in the Cook Islands
Elections in the Cook Islands
Cook